"It Could Happen to You" is a popular standard with music by Jimmy Van Heusen and lyrics by Johnny Burke.  The song was written in 1943 and was introduced by Dorothy Lamour in the Paramount musical comedy film And the Angels Sing (1944).

A recording by Jo Stafford made on December 13, 1943, was released by Capitol Records as catalog number 158. It reached the Billboard Best Seller chart on September 21, 1944, at number 10, its only week on the chart. Bing Crosby's recording for Decca Records, made on December 29, 1943, had two weeks in the Billboard charts in September 1944, with a peak position of number 18.

The Dexter Gordon composition "Fried Bananas" is based on the chord progression of "It Could Happen to You".

Other notable recordings
The song has also been recorded by Dorothy Lamour, Anita O'Day, Eydie Gormé, Frankie Vaughan, Ryo Fukui, Masaru Imada, Kimiko Kasai, Julie London, Lena Horne, Lita Roza, Peggy Lee, Perry Como, Sarah Vaughan, Tony Bennett, Johnny Hartman, Vera Lynn, Shirley Bassey, Miles Davis, Buddy DeFranco, Sonny Rollins, Chet Baker, Red Garland, Erroll Garner, Bud Powell, Ahmad Jamal, Art Garfunkel, Frank Sinatra, Doris Day, Rosemary Clooney, Michael Feinstein, June Christy, Larry Coryell, Four Freshmen, Robert Palmer, Keith Jarrett, Sonny Clark, Diana Krall, Barry Manilow, Johnny Mathis, Nat King Cole, Susannah McCorkle, Dinah Washington, Barbra Streisand, Kiri Te Kanawa, Dave Brubeck, Buddy De Franco, Bob Dorough, Andy Williams, Maynard Ferguson, Roseanna Vitro, Jeff Hamilton Trio, Tete Montoliu, Charles Pasi, Shirley Horn, Monica Zetterlund, and Bill Evans.

In popular culture
 The recording by Dinah Washington was featured in the 1999 film The Hurricane.
 The Jo Stafford recording was featured in a 2006 episode of the TV series Cold Case entitled "The Hen House" and in an episode of The Walking Dead.
 A sample of the song has been used by Japanese producer Nujabes in his song Counting Stars.
 Blair Brown sang it (in character) on The Days and Nights of Molly Dodd, in a dream sequence where Molly imagines herself pregnant, after realizing she may be.

References

1943 songs
Songs written for films
Songs with lyrics by Johnny Burke (lyricist)
Songs with music by Jimmy Van Heusen
Dorothy Lamour songs
Johnny Mathis songs
Jo Stafford songs
Andy Williams songs
Jazz compositions in E-flat major